The 2012–13 CERH European League was the 48th season of Europe's premier club roller hockey competition organized by CERH, the 16th season since it was renamed from Champions League to European League. Sixteen teams from six national associations qualified to the competition as a result of their respective national league placing in the previous season. Following a group stage and a knockout round, the four best teams contested a final four tournament to decide the competition winners, which took place in the venue of one of the teams.

The 2012–13 CERH European League final four took place in Porto, Portugal, at the Dragão Caixa, home of Porto, who qualified for this round together with Benfica (Portugal), Barcelona (Spain) and Valdagno (Italy). In the first all-Portuguese final, Benfica defeated the hosts FC Porto by 6–5 with a golden goal in extra-time, and secured their first European League title.

Teams
Sixteen teams from six national associations qualified for the 2012–13 CERH European League as a result of their placing in their respective national leagues. The number of berths allocated to each national association was dependent on the association's ranking coefficient.

Tournament

Group stage

Group A

Group B

Group C

Group D

Quarter-finals

|}

Final four
The final-four round was played at Porto's ground, the Dragão Caixa arena, after CERH approved unanimously their bid over those of Valdagno and Benfica, on 16 May 2013.

Semi-finals

Final

References

External links
 CERH website
  Roller Hockey links worldwide
  Mundook-World Roller Hockey

CERH European League
Rink Hockey Euroleague
2012 in roller hockey